Alfredo Grelak (born 20 June 1970 in Berazategui, Buenos Aires, Argentina) is an Argentine former professional footballer who played as a defender for clubs in Argentina, Chile, Spain and France.

Clubs (player)
 Quilmes 1987–1994
 Racing de Santander 1994
 Gimnástica de Torrelavega 1995
 Huracán 1995–1996
 Unión Española 1997–1998
 Caen 1998
 Gimnasia y Esgrima de Concepción del Uruguay 1998–2001
 Los Andes 2001
 Platense 2002–2003
 Gimnasia y Esgrima de Concepción del Uruguay 2003–2004
 Temperley 2004–2005
 Defensores de Cambaceres 2005–2006

Clubs (manager)
 Quilmes 2007–2009 (assistant coach)
 San Lorenzo 2009 (Youth coach)

External links
 

1970 births
Living people
People from Berazategui Partido
Argentine footballers
Association football defenders
Quilmes Atlético Club footballers
Racing de Santander players
Gimnástica de Torrelavega footballers
Club Atlético Huracán footballers
Unión Española footballers
Stade Malherbe Caen players
Gimnasia y Esgrima de Concepción del Uruguay footballers
Club Atlético Los Andes footballers
Club Atlético Platense footballers
Club Atlético Temperley footballers
Defensores de Cambaceres footballers
Argentine expatriate footballers
Argentine expatriate sportspeople in Spain
Expatriate footballers in Spain
Argentine expatriate sportspeople in Chile
Expatriate footballers in Chile
Argentine expatriate sportspeople in France
Expatriate footballers in France
Sportspeople from Buenos Aires Province